"Marea" is a song by Italian rapper and singer Madame. It was produced by Dardust and Bias, and released as a single on 4 June 2021 by Sugar Music.

The song was included in the digital re-issue of the debut album Madame.

Music video
The music video for "Marea", directed by Attilio Cusani, premiered on 28 June 2021 via Madame's YouTube channel.

Charts

Weekly charts

Year-end charts

Certifications

References

2021 songs
2021 singles
Madame (singer) songs
Sugar Music singles